Nelson "Nel" Tarleton (14 February 1906 – 12 January 1956) was an English featherweight boxer from Liverpool, England. He was British featherweight champion on three separate occasions. Tarleton was one of only seven fighters to win two or more Lonsdale Belts outright, being the first to do so, Tarleton was twice World title challenger at Anfield Stadium in Liverpool.

Boxing style
Tarleton lacked a punch, but was immensely skilful, winning most of his important fights on points. He was tall and very thin. He had only one lung from the age of two, but was still able to box successfully until he was 42.

Professional career
Born in Liverpool, Tarleton had his first professional fight on 14 January 1926 (his twentieth birthday), when he beat George Sankey on points over ten rounds at Liverpool Stadium.

He built up an impressive domestic record, with only the occasional defeat, fighting most of his bouts in his hometown of Liverpool. Then, in October 1929, he went to the United States and had a number of fights in various venues in New York City, scoring five wins, two losses, and one draw.

British featherweight title
His next fight, in November 1930, was a title challenge against the British featherweight champion, Johnny Cuthbert. The pair fought a fifteen-round draw in Liverpool Stadium. In October 1931, the pair had a rematch at Anfield Football Ground, and this time Tarleton won on points.

In November 1932, he defended his British title against Tommy Watson, in Liverpool Stadium, and lost on points.

Title regained
In July 1934, Tarleton had a re-match with Watson, at Anfield, and regained his title with another point win.

In September 1934, Tarleton fought for the world featherweight title against American fighter, Freddie Miller. The fight was held in Liverpool, and Miller won on points to retain his featherweight title.

In December 1934, Tarleton defended his title against Dave Crowley at the Empire Pool, Wembley, winning on points, and also winning the Lonsdale Belt outright.

In June 1935, Tarleton fought Freddie Miller again for his world featherweight title. The fight, as before, was held in Liverpool, and Miller won on points again, to retain his title.

In May 1936, he defended his British title against Johnny King of Manchester, defeating him on points.

In September 1936, he defended his title again, against Johnny McGrory. The fight was held at Anfield, and Mcgrory won on points to take Tarleton’s title.

Third title
In February 1940, Tarleton fought for the British featherweight title again. The fight was against holder Johnny Cusick and was also for the Commonwealth title. Tarleton won on points at Liverpool Stadium to take the British title for the third time.

In November 1940, he defended his British and Commonwealth titles at Liverpool Stadium, against Tom Smith of Sunderland, winning on points.

Tarleton continued fighting, until February 1945, when he defended his British and Commonwealth featherweight titles against Al Phillips, at Belle Vue, Manchester. At the age of 39, he won on points against his 25-year-old opponent, and retained his titles.

Tarleton did not defend his titles again but relinquished them in February 1947, at the age of 41.

After retiring, Tarleton struggled with ill health and died at the age of 49. He left a wife Barbara, and a twin boy and girl.

See also
 List of British featherweight boxing champions

References
Notes

Sources
 Maurice Golesworthy, Encyclopaedia of Boxing (Eighth Edition) (1988), Robert Hale Limited, 
 Fight stats
  Profile
 Punches that Shook Me Up (1936) by Nel Tarleton

1906 births
1956 deaths
English male boxers
Featherweight boxers
Boxers from Liverpool